Portuguese Australians refers to Australians of Portuguese descent or Portuguese-born people living in Australia.

Despite their rather modest number compared to the Greek and Italian communities, Portuguese Australians form a very organised, self-conscious and active community in many fields of Australian life. With a population spread over many parts of the continent, sporting teams, social clubs, radio shows, newspapers, outdoor cultural festivals, culinary feasts, and even a traditional ethnic neighbourhood, the ever-growing Portuguese Australians form roughly 0.26% of Australia's population in 2016. The biggest Portuguese Australian community is in Petersham, Sydney: but there are other communities around Australia such as Melbourne, Wollongong, Newcastle and Perth. There are also communities present, to a lesser extent, in Brisbane, Adelaide and Darwin. At the time of the 2016 census, there were 61,885 Portuguese migrants and Australians with Portuguese heritage living in Australia.

Portuguese cuisine has also made its way into mainstream Australian society, with the fast expansion and establishment of restaurant and fast food outlets such as "Nando's", "Oporto" and "Ogalo" to confirm its success. The Portuguese "pastel de nata" is a very popular delicacy in Australia and is commonly found throughout the country.

One of the most high-visibility moments for the Portuguese community was in 2005, when António Milhinhos, a shopkeeper from Darwin, was awarded the Senior Australian of the Year Award for his outstanding charity works and continuous catastrophe relief since 1983.

History

In New South Wales

A wave of post-war immigrants migrated from Europe to Sydney, in particular the Portuguese, who settled in the inner-city areas of Petersham (sometimes considered Australia's largest Portuguese enclave) and Surry Hills.

In Victoria
Portugal’s links with Australia may extend as far back as the sixteenth century, predating Captain Cook’s voyage to Australia by 250 years. Some evidence suggests that Portuguese explorers were the first Europeans to visit Australia.

Three hundred years later, a few Portuguese were among the earliest settlers in Australia. Emanuel and Ana Serrão and their infant daughter arrived in Sydney in 1824, and moved to Warrnambool with their family in 1852. Few followed, and by 1901 only 86 Victorians were Portugal-born. Males made up 90% of the community.

The Portugal-born population in Victoria declined in the early twentieth century, and by 1933, only 12 were recorded in the census.

While the post-war migration boom had little effect on the Portuguese population of Victoria, the late 1960s saw the beginning of a dramatic increase in immigration. After the Portuguese colonial wars in Angola and Mozambique ended in 1974, and the former Portuguese colony of East Timor was invaded by Indonesian troops in 1975, more ethnic Portuguese immigrants settled in Victoria. The number of immigrants from Portugal also increased, from 131 in 1966 to 2,335 in 1986.

By 2016, 2,727 Portugal-born migrants were living in Victoria. The Portuguese community in Victoria today also includes people from the former Portuguese colonies of Macau, East Timor, Cape Verde, Mozambique, Angola, Goa and Brazil.

Members of the Portugal-born community today are predominantly employed as tradespeople and workers within the manufacturing and construction industries. Almost three-quarters still speak Portuguese at home.

The community is supported by organizations including the Portuguese Community Council of Australia, which serves as an umbrella organization for all Portuguese people in Australia. Portuguese language radio programs, language classes and sporting clubs help maintain the community in Victoria. Events such as performances by Madeira Folk Dancing provide an opportunity for the wider community to appreciate the rich, vibrant Portuguese culture.

In Western Australia
Portuguese migrants from the islands of Madeira settled in Fremantle in Western Australia in the 1950s and established a fishing community which, by the mid-1980s, had grown to about 6,000 people, including their descendants. Since then, Perth and Western Australia in general have been a frequent destination for Portuguese students and skilled labor, and although no mass-migration has occurred, the Portuguese population is still prevalent in the state. John Da Silva, the founder and owner of Bell-Vista vegetables, one of Western Australia's biggest vegetable provider migrated to Fremantle in the Portuguese migrant wave to that area in the 1960s.

Portuguese Australians

See also
 Brazilian Australians
 European Australians
 Europeans in Oceania
 Immigration to Australia
 Petersham, New South Wales
 Portuguese in the United Kingdom
 Portuguese people
 Portuguese in Asia and Oceania
 Theory of the Portuguese discovery of Australia

References

External links
Consulate General of Portugal, Sydney

European Australian